Justin Vincent Cochrane (born 26 January 1982) is a former professional footballer who played as a centre-back or defensive midfielder. Born in England, he represented the Antigua and Barbuda national team at international level. He is now Head of Coaching at Brentford.

Club career
Born to an Antiguan father and a Saint Lucian mother, in Hackney, at the former Mothers' Hospital, Cochrane grew up in Edmonton, North London. Cochrane started his career at the London club Queens Park Rangers as a trainee and played for the youth and reserve teams. He made his first-team debut for the club as a second-half substitute in the final home game of the 2000–01 season versus Stockport County, however he was sent off within minutes of coming on. He was sold to non-League Hayes in the close season but in July 2003 was signed by Crewe Alexandra on a free transfer.

In February 2006, Cochrane was loaned out to Gillingham, in an attempt to get first-team football, and in April 2006 had a trial with Luton Town where he scored a goal in a reserve match. He was released by Crewe at the end of the 2005–06 season, subsequently signing a two-year deal with Rotherham United.

Rotherham released him in June 2007, and after playing for Yeovil Town on a non-contract basis, he signed a short-term deal with them on 31 August 2007. He also had a spell at Millwall in which he made one brief substitute appearance.

Cochrane then had a short trial at Leyton Orient before joining Rushden & Diamonds on 19 December 2008 on non-contract forms, before leaving the following month.

On the February 2009, he signed a contract with Aldershot Town. Gary Waddock, the Aldershot manager and former QPR youth coach, was familiar with Cochrane through his time at QPR.

However, Cochrane was released at the beginning of the 2009–10 season, and went on trial at Conference National club Hayes & Yeading United, playing in their pre-season friendly versus Maidenhead United on 25 July, before signing a contract with them.

He last played for Boreham Wood, for whom he scored his first goal in a FA Trophy match against Eastbourne Borough on 11 December 2010, which ended in a 3–1 defeat for Boreham Wood.

International career
Cochrane played for Antigua and Barbuda in non-FIFA regulated friendlies in June 2008, scoring a goal. He made his debut against Saint Kitts and Nevis in a friendly before playing both legs of Antigua's World Cup qualifiers against Cuba. Cochrane also turned out for Antigua and Barbuda during Second Round of the Caribbean Championships that year.

Coaching career
Cochrane was a youth team coach at Tottenham Hotspur football club and, on 29 August 2019, was announced as the new head coach of England U16s having stepped up from the U15s age group. On 24 September 2020, Cochrane was appointed England U17s head coach as well as lead for the Youth Development Phase (U15/U16/U17). Concurrent with his FA role, Cochrane was seconded to AFC Wimbledon as a temporary coach in early 2021.

On 8 June 2021, Cochrane was appointed as head of player development and coaching at Manchester United's Academy. In June 2022, he moved on to the role of Head of Coaching at Brentford.

Career statistics
Scores and results list Antigua and Barbuda's goal tally first.

References

External links

 Player profile – Rushden & Diamonds
 
 Record at FIFA Tournaments – FIFA

1982 births
Living people
English footballers
Antigua and Barbuda footballers
Queens Park Rangers F.C. players
Hayes F.C. players
Crewe Alexandra F.C. players
Gillingham F.C. players
Rotherham United F.C. players
Yeovil Town F.C. players
Millwall F.C. players
Rushden & Diamonds F.C. players
Aldershot Town F.C. players
Hayes & Yeading United F.C. players
Boreham Wood F.C. players
Antigua Barracuda F.C. players
English Football League players
National League (English football) players
English sportspeople of Antigua and Barbuda descent
Antigua and Barbuda international footballers
Footballers from the London Borough of Hackney
Association football defenders
USL Championship players
Black British sportspeople
Tottenham Hotspur F.C. non-playing staff
Association football coaches
English people of Saint Lucian descent
English football managers
Manchester United F.C. non-playing staff
Brentford F.C. non-playing staff
AFC Wimbledon non-playing staff